The Cooks Peak Fire was a wildfire that burned north of the community of Ocate in Mora County and Colfax County, in the U.S. state of New Mexico, as part of the 2022 New Mexico wildfire season. , the fire burned  and was 100% contained on the evening of May 13, 2022. The exact cause of the fire is unknown and under investigation.

Development

April 
The fire was first reported on April 17, 2022, at approximately 4:31 PM MNT. The cause of the fire is currently under investigation. There were 548 firefighting personnel on scene as of April 28, 2022, according to the BSA.

Containment 
, the Cooks Peak Fire was fully contained.

Impact

Closures & Evacuations 
The Philmont Scout Ranch, just north of the fire, began evacuating staff when the fire rushed north on April 24. As of April 30, 2022, the fire had burned  of the scout ranch. Parts of Colfax County were evacuated, as well as the community of Cimarron

See also 

 2022 New Mexico wildfires
 Calf Canyon/Hermits Peak Fire

References 

2022 New Mexico wildfires
Wildfires in New Mexico
2022 in New Mexico
April 2022 events in the United States
2022 meteorology
Mora County, New Mexico